Lac du Bonnet may refer to:

 Lac du Bonnet, Manitoba, a community in Canada
 Lac du Bonnet (electoral district)
 Lac du Bonnet Airport

See also 
 Rural Municipality of Lac du Bonnet